Telstar is a series of satellites, including the first active communications satellite.

Telstar may also refer to:

Entertainment

"Telstar" (instrumental), a 1962 number 1 hit instrumental by The Tornados, written and produced by Joe Meek in honour of the communications satellite
Telstar: The Joe Meek Story, a 2009 feature film about the life of Joe Meek, starring Con O'Neill and Kevin Spacey
Telstar (game console), a video game console series released by Coleco
 The Telstars, a Swedish pop-jazz group founded by Marcus Österdahl

Sports

SC Telstar, a Dutch football club based in Velsen
Telstar (women's football club), based in Velsen
Adidas Telstar, a football that Adidas designed in 1963 with a truncated icosahedron design and used in FIFA World Cup competition in 1970 and 1974

Other uses

Ford Telstar, a mid-size car manufactured by the Ford Motor Company
Telstar Records, a British record company
Telstar Regional Middle/High School, a school in Maine, United States
Telstar trimaran, a trailerable sailboat, designed by Tony Smith and built from 1971 to 1981 in United Kingdom and then from 2003 to 2009 in United States
'Telstar' apple, a seedling selected from 'Golden Delicious' x 'Kidd's Orange Red'

See also
Telestar, a German television award from 1983 to 1998
Telstra
TellStar